Meraj Esmaeili (born 13 January 2000) is an Iranian footballer who plays as a goalkeeper for Iranian club Paykan in the Persian Gulf Pro League.

Club career

Zob Ahan
He made his debut for Zob Ahan in 29th fixtures of 2018–19 Iran Pro League against Foolad while he substituted in for Mohammad Bagher Sadeghi.

Honours

International 
Iran U16
 AFC U-16 Championship runner-up: 2016

References

2000 births
Living people
Iranian footballers
Zob Ahan Esfahan F.C. players
Association football goalkeepers
People from Andimeshk
Sportspeople from Khuzestan province